Güven Güneri (born September 22, 1987) is a Turkish footballer who plays for Belediye Kütahyaspor.

References

External links

1987 births
Living people
Turkish footballers
Turkey youth international footballers
Fenerbahçe S.K. footballers
Akademik Sofia players
Kardemir Karabükspor footballers
Elazığspor footballers
First Professional Football League (Bulgaria) players
Turkish expatriate footballers
Expatriate footballers in Bulgaria
Association football midfielders